Colico Lake is located in the La Araucanía Region of Chile. The neighboring Caburgua Lake lies to the east of the lake and the Villarrica Lake to the south.

Species of fish in the lake include Rainbow trout and pejerrey. Nearby flora includes trees such as coigue and oak, and shrubs such as Chilean firebush, hummingbird fuchsia, and quila.

References 

Colico
Lakes of Araucanía Region